John Philip Wiatrak (March 30, 1913October 21, 2000) was a football center for the University of Washington. He was selected by the Cleveland Rams in the fourth round of the 1937 NFL Draft. Wiatrak played one season for the Detroit Lions.

Early years 
John Wiatrak was born in Chicago, Illinois. He was one of the "Strauss Boys" who were recruited by Alfred "Doc" Strauss. Dr. Alfred Strauss, a renowned surgeon and a pioneer in cancer research, was a Washington alumnus that moved to Chicago when he attended medical school. Over the years he recruited more than 100 football players from the Chicago area to the University of Washington, several of whom became All Americans.

Football career 
At the University of Washington Wiatrak lettered in 1934, '35 and '36 seasons. He was honored by playing, along with his teammate Max Starcevich, in the 1937 Chicago Tribune All-Star Game. He was a backup center for the collegiate team that defeated the defending NFL Champion Green Bay Packers, 6-0.
John was drafted by the Cleveland Rams but did not play for them. Later he did play one in one game for the 1939 Detroit Lions.

Later life 
Waitrak married a Seattle girl, Muriel Ralston. They moved to Chicago in 1939 and founded an electrical contracting company. John and Muriel moved back to Western Washington in 1980 and lived in Olympia until their deaths.

References

Washington Huskies football players
American football centers
1913 births
2000 deaths
Players of American football from Chicago
Cleveland Rams players